This is a list of notable events in music that took place in the year 1956.

Specific locations
1956 in British music
1956 in Norwegian music

Specific genres
1956 in country music
1956 in jazz

Events
January 3 – Bach: The Goldberg Variations, Glenn Gould's debut solo piano recording, is released by Columbia Records in the United States; it sells 40,000 copies by 1960.
January 26
The North American premiere of Carlos Chávez's Third Symphony is given by the New York Philharmonic conducted by the composer.
Buddy Holly's first recording sessions for Decca Records take place in Nashville, Tennessee.
Roy Orbison signs with Sun Records.
January 27 – Elvis Presley's single "Heartbreak Hotel" / "I Was the One" is released. It goes on to be Elvis's first #1 hit.
January 28 – Elvis Presley makes his national television debut on The Dorsey Brothers Stage Show.
February 3 – The Symphony of the Air, conducted by Leonard Bernstein, gives the world première of Robert Moevs's Fourteen Variations for Orchestra (composed in 1952) in New York.
February 11 – Henry Barraud's Concertino for Piano and Winds receives its world-première performance by Eugene List and members of the New York Chamber Ensemble in New York City.
March – The Coasters' recording career begins, with "Turtle Dovin'".
March 10 – Carl Perkins' single "Blue Suede Shoes" enters the R&B charts, the first time a country music artist has made it on the R&B charts.
March 21 – World première of Heitor Villa-Lobos's Eleventh Symphony, by the Boston Symphony Orchestra, conducted by Charles Münch, at Carnegie Hall in New York City.
March 22 – Carl Perkins is injured in a car accident near Wilmington, Delaware, on his way to New York City to make an appearance on The Ed Sullivan Show. He spends several months in hospital.
March 24 – The first regularly scheduled nationally broadcast rock & roll show, Rock 'n Roll Dance Party, with Alan Freed as host, premières on the CBS Radio Network.
March 26 – Colonel Tom Parker formally becomes Elvis Presley's manager.
March 31 – Elvis Presley films a screen test for Paramount Pictures.
April 3 – Elvis Presley makes his first appearance on The Milton Berle Show.
April 6 – Paramount Pictures signs Elvis Presley to a three-picture deal.
April 10 – A group of racial segregationists (followers of Asa Earl Carter) rush the stage at a Nat King Cole concert in Birmingham, Alabama, but are quickly captured.
April 22 – The 2i's Coffee Bar opens in Old Compton Street, Soho, London; its basement rapidly becomes a pioneering venue for rock & roll music in Britain, Tommy Steele being resident from July.
May – Gene Autry's Melody Ranch, a CBS Radio Sunday evening program on the air since 1940 (except for a hiatus from 1942 to 1945), ends its run.
May 2 – For the first time in Billboard magazine history, five singles appear in both the pop and R&B Top Ten charts. They are Elvis Presley's "Heartbreak Hotel" (#1 pop, #6 R&B), Carl Perkins' "Blue Suede Shoes" (#4 pop, #3 R&B), Little Richard's "Long Tall Sally" (#9 pop, #1 R&B), the Platters' "(You've Got) The Magic Touch" (#10 pop, #7 R&B) and Frankie Lymon and the Teenagers' "Why Do Fools Fall in Love" (#7 pop, #4 R&B). Presley's and Perkins' singles also appeared on the country and western Top Ten chart at #1 and #2 respectively.
May 6
Elvis Presley appears on the Milton Berle show.
In Paris, Heitor Villa-Lobos records his Bachiana Brasileira No. 9 with the strings of the Orchestre National de la Radiodiffusion Française, for EMI.
May 6–28 – In Paris, Heitor Villa-Lobos supervises the recording of his Bachianas Brasileiras No. 6 by Fernand Dufrene (flute) and René Plessier (bassoon) and his Bachianas Brasileiras No. 2 with the Orchestre National de la Radiodiffusion Française, the four suites of his Descobrimento do Brasil, his Chôros No. 10 and his Invocação em defesa da patria, with Maria Kareska (soprano), the Chorale des , and the Orchestre National de la Radiodiffusion Française for EMI.
May 8
Ernst Toch's Third Symphony is awarded the Pulitzer Prize for Music.
Benjamin Britten's opera Gloriana is given its US premiere in Cincinnati, in concert form conducted by Josef Krips.
May 24 – First-ever Eurovision Song Contest from the Kursaal Theatre, Lugano, Switzerland. Seven countries participate, each with two songs. Switzerland is declared the winner, with Lys Assia singing "Refrain".
June – The winners of the Queen Elisabeth International Music Competition, held in Brussels and devoted this year to the piano, are:
First Prize: Vladimir Ashkenazy
Second Prize: John Browning
Third Prize: Andrzej Czajkowski
Fourth Prize: Cécile Ousset
Fifth Prize: Lazar Berman
June 3 – Fred Diodati replaces Al Alberts as lead singer of The Four Aces.
June 5 – Elvis Presley introduces his new single, "Hound Dog", on The Milton Berle Show, scandalizing the audience with his suggestive hip movements.
June 7–13 – In Paris, Heitor Villa-Lobos records his Bachiana Brasileira No. 5 with Victoria de los Ángeles (soprano) and a cello ensemble from the Orchestre National de la Radiodiffusion Française, for EMI.
June 13 – Herbert von Karajan is announced as the new artistic director of the Vienna State Opera, to succeed Karl Böhm starting in September.
July – At the Berkshire Festival, Benny Goodman records both the Clarinet Concerto (with the Boston Symphony Orchestra, conducted by Charles Münch) and the Quintet for Clarinet and Strings (with the Boston Symphony String Quartet) by Wolfgang Amadeus Mozart, for RCA Victor. The recordings are made in stereo, though first released in 1957 only in a monaural mixdown (the first stereo issue is in 1968).
July 9 – Dick Clark hosts American Bandstand for the first time
July 11–22 – The Darmstädter Ferienkurse are held in Darmstadt with a series of lectures by Theodor W. Adorno, two public discussions of the new medium of electronic music, and world premieres of works by (amongst others) Richard Rodney Bennett, Pierre Boulez, Jacques Calonne, Aldo Clementi, Luc Ferrari, Alexander Goehr, Bengt Hambraeus, Hans Werner Henze, Bruno Maderna, Henri Pousseur, and Karlheinz Stockhausen.
July 17 – The Metropolitan Opera Association announces the cancellation of its 1956–57 season because of a labor dispute.
July 19 – The American Guild of Musical Artists and the Metropolitan Opera Association announce a resolution of their dispute, so that the season will begin on October 29 as originally planned.
July 22 – The first UK Albums Chart is published, in Record Mirror; Frank Sinatra's Songs for Swingin' Lovers! tops it for the first two weeks.
Summer – John Lennon forms a skiffle group, The Quarrymen, with friends from Quarry Bank High School in Liverpool, England, originally Eric Griffiths and Pete Shotton.
August–September – Maria Callas makes studio recordings of Giuseppe Verdi's, Il trovatore, conducted by Herbert von Karajan, Giacomo Puccini's, La bohème, conducted by Antonino Votto, and Giuseppe Verdi's, Un ballo in maschera, also conducted by Votto, for EMI.
September 5 – The posthumous world première of Sergei Prokofiev's Piano Concerto No. 4 (for the left hand), composed in 1931, takes place in Berlin, performed by Siegfried Rapp and the West Berlin Radio Symphony Orchestra, conducted by Martin Rich.
September 9 – Elvis Presley appears on The Ed Sullivan Show.
October 10–20 – First Warsaw Autumn International Festival of Contemporary Music.
October 14 – Leopold Stokowski conducts the Symphony of the Air in three world premièees at Carnegie Hall: Charles Ives's Browning Overture, Alan Hovhaness's Symphony No. 3, and Kurt Leimer's Piano Concerto No. 4.
October 16 – The New York Philharmonic-Symphony Orchestra announces that, at the request of their music director, Dimitri Mitropoulos, they have engaged Leonard Bernstein to share the direction of the orchestra with Mitropoulos for the 1957–58 season.
October 20–21 – The Donaueschinger Musiktage new-music festival takes place with a memorial concert featuring the music of Arthur Honegger, and also concerts with compositions of (amongst others) Luciano Berio, Pierre Boulez, Claude Debussy, Gottfried von Einem, Hans Werner Henze, Roman Haubenstock-Ramati, Maurice Jarre, Olivier Messiaen, and Igor Stravinsky
October 22 – Sigurd Rascher and the Chattanooga Symphony Orchestra open their 1956–57 season with a concert including the world première of Carl Anton Wirth's Concerto for Saxophone and Orchestra.
October 29 – In New York, the Metropolitan Opera's seventy-second season opens with a revival of Bellini's Norma, made especially for Maria Callas's Metropolitan debut in the title role.
November 5
Nat King Cole becomes the first major black performer to host a variety show on national television, when The Nat King Cole Show is broadcast.
Royal Performance in the presence of Queen Elizabeth II of the United Kingdom, by Liberace, in London.
November 13 – The first of a series of Hoffnung Music Festival Concerts takes place at the Royal Festival Hall, in London.
November 28 – Yoko Ono, recently divorced from Japanese composer Toshi Ichiyanagi, marries Anthony Cox.
December 4 – Elvis Presley, Jerry Lee Lewis, Carl Perkins and Johnny Cash record together at Sun Studios in Memphis, Tennessee. The sessions are later released under the name "the Million Dollar Quartet"
December 19 – Breaking the record for the highest number of concurrent singles by a single artist, Elvis Presley holds 9 positions on the Billboard Hot 100 chart. Presley would hold the record until 1964 when the Beatles hold 14 positions on the chart.
Pierre Gabaye wins the Prix de Rome in the Musical Composition category.
Gene Vincent signs a publishing contract with Bill Lowery.
Dalida's musical career begins on Barclay Records in Europe as (one of) the first biggest "world pop star" and sex symbol and she is the first artist to have her photo on a single in France. 175 000 copies of her big hits "Bambino" are sold in a few weeks.
Chrysler Corporation provides an in-car turntable 16 rpm record player with 7-inch ultramicrogroove records in its luxury make, the Imperial. The machine was developed by Peter Carl Goldmark – the man who invented the 33 rpm long playing (LP) record format.
Cameo-Parkway Records is formed in Philadelphia, Pennsylvania, by Kal Mann and Bernie Lowe.
Foundation of the Korean piano brand Young Chang.
Cleveland television station WEWS-TV launches Polka Varieties, a regular Sunday-afternoon, hour-long program devoted to polka music; Frank Yankovic leads the original band to perform on the show.

Albums released
 The Ames Brothers – Ames Brothers
 Ames Brothers Concert – The Ames Brothers
 The Ames Brothers With Hugo Winterhalter – The Ames Brothers and Hugo Winterhalter
 Bing Sings Whilst Bregman Swings – Bing Crosby
 Black Coffee – Peggy Lee
 Bluejean Bop! – Gene Vincent
 Blue Rose – Rosemary Clooney
 The Boss of the Blues – Big Joe Turner
 Calendar Girl – Julie London
 Calypso – Harry Belafonte, first LP to sell over a million copies
 The Champ – Jimmy Smith
 Charles Aznavour chante Charles Aznavour, vol. 3 – Charles Aznavour
 Chet Baker Sings – Chet Baker
 Chris Connor – Chris Connor
 Clifford Brown and Max Roach at Basin Street – Clifford Brown and Max Roach
 The Complete Porgy and Bess – Original Broadway Cast
 Count Basie Swings, Joe Williams Sings – Joe Williams
 Day by Day – Doris Day
 Dinner in Colombia – Aldemaro Romero
 Dinner Music for People Who Aren't Very Hungry – Spike Jones
 Django – Modern Jazz Quartet
 Do You Remember When? – McGuire Sisters
 The East Side – Patti Page
 Ella and Louis – Ella Fitzgerald and Louis Armstrong
 Ella Fitzgerald Sings the Cole Porter Songbook – Ella Fitzgerald
 Ella Fitzgerald Sings the Rodgers & Hart Songbook – Ella Fitzgerald
 Ellington at Newport – Duke Ellington
 Elvis – Elvis Presley
 Elvis Presley – Elvis Presley (debut)
 Exactly Like You – The Ames Brothers
 Favorite Cowboy Songs – Sons of the Pioneers
 Finger Style Guitar – Chet Atkins
 Flight to Romance – Aldemaro Romero
 Fontessa – Modern Jazz Quartet
 The Four Aces – The Four Aces
 Frank Sinatra Conducts Tone Poems of Color – Frank Sinatra
 Frankie Laine & The Four Lads – Frankie Laine
 A Girl Named Jo – Jo Stafford
 The Hi-Fi Nightingale – Caterina Valente
 High Society – Frank Sinatra, Bing Crosby, Louis Armstrong & Celeste Holm
 Holding Hands at Midnight – Dinah Shore
 Howdy! – Pat Boone
 Improvisations – Stéphane Grappelli
 In the Land of Hi-Fi – Patti Page
 Informal Jazz – Elmo Hope
 Kay Starr Country – Kay Starr
 The Lark in the Morning – Liam Clancy and Tommy Makem
 Latin Kick – Cal Tjader
 Lawrence Welk Plays Dixieland – Lawrence Welk
 Lennie Tristano – Lennie Tristano
 Listen To The Hi-Lo's – The Hi-Lo's
 Lonely Girl – Julie London
 Love Songs Sung – Dinah Shore
 Love's Old Sweet Song – The Ames Brothers
 Lullaby Time – Bing Crosby
 Manhattan Tower – Patti Page
 Max Roach + 4 – Max Roach
 Merry Christmas – Lawrence Welk
 Miles Davis Volume 1 – Miles Davis
 Miles Davis Volume 2 – Miles Davis
 Miles: The New Miles Davis Quintet – Miles Davis
 Miles Davis with Horns – Miles Davis
 The Misty Miss Christy – June Christy
 Moondog – Moondog
 Music and Memories – Georgia Gibbs
Music for Two in Love – Patti Page
 My Fair Lady – Shelly Manne & His Friends
 New Jazz Conceptions – Bill Evans
 Nursery Days – Woody Guthrie
 Odetta Sings Ballads and Blues – Odetta
 On Hand – The Hi-Lo's
 On the Sunny Side – The Four Lads
 Page Three – Easy Listening – Patti Page
 Pat Boone – Pat Boone
 Pick a Polka – Lawrence Welk
 Pick Yourself Up with Anita O'Day – Anita O'Day
 Pithecanthropus Erectus – Charles Mingus
 The Platters – The Platters
 Playboys – Chet Baker and Art Pepper
 Rock 'n' Roll Stage Show – Bill Haley & His Comets
 Rock, Rock, Rock – Various Artists
 Say It with Music – Lawrence Welk
 Shillelaghs and Shamrocks – Bing Crosby
 Singin' And Swingin'  – The Mills Brothers
 Ski Trails – Jo Stafford
 Song Favorites – Georgia Gibbs
 Songs by Kay Starr – Kay Starr
 Songs for Swingin' Lovers! – Frank Sinatra
 Songs I Wish I Had Sung the First Time Around – Bing Crosby
 Songs of Faith – Aretha Franklin
 Songs to Grow on for Mother and Child – Woody Guthrie
 Squeeze Play – John Serry, Sr.
 Swingin' with Her Nibs – Georgia Gibbs
 Swingin' with Kay Starr  – Kay Starr
 The Teenagers Featuring Frankie Lymon – The Teenagers Featuring Frankie Lymon
 Tenor Madness – Sonny Rollins
 This Is Sinatra! – Frank Sinatra
 Three Ragas – Ravi Shankar
 Toshiko – Her Trio, Her Quartet – Toshiko Akiyoshi
 The Toshiko Trio – Toshiko Akiyoshi
 Tragic Songs of Life – The Louvin Brothers
 Two For Tonight – Bing Crosby
 Under Glass – The Hi-Lo's
 The Unique Thelonious Monk – Thelonious Monk
 Venezuelan Fiesta – Aldemaro Romero
The Voices of Patti Page – Patti Page
 Heitor Villa-Lobos: La Découverte du Brésil, Invocation pour la Défense de la Patrie, Chôros no 10 – Chœrs et Orchestre National de la Radiodiffusion Française; Maria Kareska, soprano; Chorale des ; direction Heitor Villa-Lobos. 2 LPs. Columbia (France) FCX 602 & 603
 Whims of Chambers – Paul Chambers
 The Wildest! – Louis Prima
 Work Time – Sonny Rollins
 You Go to My Head – Patti Page

Biggest hit singles

The following songs achieved the highest chart positions in the charts of 1956.

US No. 1 hit singles
These singles reached the top of US Billboard magazine's charts in 1956.

Top hits on record

Top R&B and country hits on record
"Blue Suede Shoes" – Carl Perkins
"A Casual Look" – Six Teens
"Cry! Cry! Cry!" – Johnny Cash
"Get Rhythm" – Johnny Cash
"I Walk the Line" – Johnny Cash
"In the Still of the Night" – Five Satins
"It's Too Late" – Chuck Willis
"I've Loved And Lost Again" – Patsy Cline
"Jambalaya (On the Bayou)" – Brenda Lee
"Lucky Lips" – Ruth Brown
"My Pink Cadillac" – Hal Willis
"One Kiss Led to Another" – The Coasters
"Ooby Dooby" – Roy Orbison
"Tra La La" – LaVern Baker
"Treasure of Love" – Clyde McPhatter and The Drifters

Published popular music
 "11th Hour Melody", words: Carl Sigman, music: King Palmer
 "Abbondanza", words and music: Frank Loesser
 "After The Lights Go Down Low" w.m. Alan White & Leroy Lovett
 "Ain't Got No Home" w.m. Clarence Henry
 "Allegheny Moon" w.m. Al Hoffman & Dick Manning
 "Anastasia" w. Paul Francis Webster m. Alfred Newman
 "Any Way You Want Me (That's How I Will Be)" w.m. Aaron Schroeder & Cliff Owens
 "Around the World" w. Harold Adamson m. Victor Young
 "The Banana Boat Song" trad arr. Alan Arkin, Bob Carey & Erik Darling
 "Be-Bop-A-Lula" w.m. Tex Davis & Gene Vincent
 "Bells Are Ringing" w. Betty Comden & Adolph Green m. Jule Styne
 "The Best of All Possible Worlds" w. Richard Wilbur m. Leonard Bernstein
 "Big D" w.m. Frank Loesser
 "The Birds And The Bees", Mack David, Harry Warren
 "Bloodnock's Rock And Roll Call", T. Carbone
 "Bluebottle Blues", Spike Milligan, Carbone
 "Bo Weevil" w.m. Dave Bartholomew & Antoine "Fats" Domino
 "Boppin' The Blues" w.m. Carl Perkins & Howard Griffin
 "Born To Be With You" w.m. Don Robertson
 "Brown Eyed Handsome Man", Chuck Berry
 "The Bus Stop Song" (aka "A Paper Of Pins") w.m. Ken Darby
 "Can I Steal a Little Love" w.m. Phil Tuminello
 "Canadian Sunset" w. Norman Gimbel m. Eddie Heywood
 "Chain Gang" w.m. Sol Quasha & Herb Yakus
 "Cindy, Oh Cindy" w.m. Bob Barron & Burt Long
 "Don't Be Cruel" w.m. Otis Blackwell & Elvis Presley
 "Don't Forbid Me" w.m. Charles Singleton
 "Eddie My Love", A. Collins, M. Davis, S. Ling
 "Fever" w.m. Eddie Cooley & John Davenport
 "The Flying Saucer" w. Bill Buchanan & Dickie Goodman
 "Fools Fall In Love" w.m. Jerry Leiber & Mike Stoller
 "Friendly Persuasion" w. Paul Francis Webster m. Dimitri Tiomkin
 "The Garden of Eden" w.m. Dennise Haas Norwood
 "Get Me to the Church on Time" w. Alan Jay Lerner m. Frederick Loewe. Introduced by Stanley Holloway in the musical My Fair Lady and also performed by Holloway in the 1964 film.
 "Glendora" w.m. Ray Stanley
 "Glitter and Be Gay" w. Richard Wilbut m. Leonard Bernstein
 "The Gnu", Michael Flanders & Donald Swann
 "Good Golly, Miss Molly" w.m. John Marascalco & Robert Blackwell
 "Goodnight My Love" G. Motola, J. Marascalco
 "The Green Door" w. Marvin Moore m. Bob Davie
 "Happy To Make Your Acquaintance" w.m. Frank Loesser
 "The Happy Whistler" m. Don Robertson
 "Heartbreak Hotel" w.m. Mae Boren Axton, Tommy Durden & Elvis Presley
 "Hey! Jealous Lover" w.m. Sammy Cahn, Kay Twomey & Bee Walker
 "High Society Calypso" w.m. Cole Porter
 "The Hippopotamus", Michael Flanders & Donald Swann
 "Honky Tonk" w. Henry Glover m. Bill Doggett, Billy Butler, Shep Shephard & Clifford Scott
 "Hot Diggity" w. m.(adapt) Al Hoffman & Dick Manning
 "A House With Love In It" w. Sylvia Dee m. Sid Lippman
 "(How Little It Matters) How Little We Know(1)" w. Carolyn Leigh m. Philip Springer
 "I Could Have Danced All Night" w. Alan Jay Lerner m. Frederick Loewe. Introduced by Julie Andrews in the musical My Fair Lady. Performed in the 1964 film by Marni Nixon dubbing for Audrey Hepburn.
 "I Dreamed" w. Marvin Moore m. Charles Grean
 "I Love You, Samantha" w.m. Cole Porter Introduced by Bing Crosby in the film High Society.
 "I Put a Spell on You" w.m. Jay Hawkins & Herb Slotkin
 "I Walk the Line" w.m. Johnny Cash
 "I Want You, I Need You, I Love You" w. Maurice Mysels m. Ira Kosloff
 "I Was The One" w.m. Claude Demetrius, Bill Peppers, Hal Blair, Aaron Schroeder
 "If I Had My Druthers" w. Johnny Mercer m. Gene De Paul
 "I'm an Ordinary Man" w. Alan Jay Lerner m. Frederick Loewe Introduced by Rex Harrison in the musical My Fair Lady
 "I'm Walkin'" w.m. Antoine "Fats" Domino & Dave Bartholomew
 "I'm Walking Backwards For Christmas", Spike Milligan, T. Carbone
 "In the Still of the Nite" w.m. Fred Parris
 "It Only Hurts For A Little While" w. Mack David m. Fred Spielman
 "It's Not For Me To Say" w. Al Stillman m. Robert Allen
 "I've Grown Accustomed To Her Face" w. Alan Jay Lerner m. Frederick Loewe. Introduced by Rex Harrison in the musical My Fair Lady.
 "Ivory Tower" w.m. Jack Fulton & Lois Steele
 "Joey, Joey, Joey" w.m. Frank Loesser
 "Jubilation T. Cornpone" w. Johnny Mercer m. Gene De Paul. Introduced by Stubby Kaye in the musical Li'l Abner.
 "Juke Box Baby" w. Noel Sherman m. Joe Sherman
 "Just In Time" w. Betty Comden & Adolph Green m. Jule Styne. Introduced by Judy Holliday and Sydney Chaplin in the musical Bells Are Ringing
 "Knee Deep in the Blues" w.m. Melvin Endsley
 "Lay Down Your Arms" w. (English) Paddy Roberts, (Swedish) Ake Gerhard m. Ake Gerhard & Leon Land
 "Leone Jump" m. John Serry Sr.
 "Let The Good Times Roll" w.m. Leonard Lee
 "Long Before I Knew You" w. Betty Comden & Adolph Green m. Jule Styne. Introduced by Judy Holliday and Sydney Chaplin in the musical Bells Are Ringing
 "Long Tall Sally" w.m. Enotris Johnson, Richard Penniman & Robert A. Blackwell
 "Look Homeward Angel" w.m. Wally Gold
 "Love Me Tender" w. Elvis Presley & Vera Matson m. George R. Poulton
 "Love Me" w.m. Jerry Leiber & Mike Stoller
 "Lucky Lips" w.m. Jerry Leiber & Mike Stoller
 "(You've Got) The Magic Touch" w.m. Buck Ram
 "Mama From The Train" w.m. Irving Gordon
 "Mama, Teach Me To Dance" w.m. Al Hoffman & Dick Manning
 "Mangos" w.m. Sid Wayne & Dee Libbey
 "Maria" w. Stephen Sondheim m. Leonard Bernstein
 "Marianne" w.m. Terry Gilkyson, Frank Miller & Richard Dehr
 "Married I Can Always Get" w.m. Gordon Jenkins
 "Mary's Boy Child" w.m. Jester Hairston
"Mind If I Make Love to You?" w.m. Cole Porter. Introduced by Frank Sinatra in the film High Society
 "The Money Tree" w. Cliff Ferre m. Mark McIntyre
 "Moonlight Gambler" w. Bob Hilliard m. Philip Springer
 "More" w. Tom Glazer m. Alex Alstone
 "The Most Happy Fella" w.m. Frank Loesser
 "Mutual Admiration Society" w. Matt Dubey m. Harold Karr. Introduced by Ethel Merman and Virginia Gibson in the musical Happy Hunting
 "My Heart Is So Full Of You" w.m. Frank Loesser
 "My Lucky Charm", Sammy Cahn & Nicholas Brodszky
 "Namely You" w. Johnny Mercer m. Gene De Paul
 "Now You Has Jazz" w.m. Cole Porter. Introduced by Bing Crosby and Louis Armstrong in the film High Society.
 "Oh What a Nite" w.m. Marvin Junior & John Funches
 "On The Street Where You Live" w. Alan Jay Lerner m. Frederick Loewe. Introduced by John Michael King in the musical My Fair Lady.
 "Our Language Of Love" w.m. Monte Norman, David Heneker, Julian More, Alexander Breffort & Marguerite Monnot
 "Pardners" w. Sammy Cahn m. Jimmy Van Heusen. Introduced by Dean Martin and Jerry Lewis in the film of the same name
 "The Party's Over" w. Betty Comden & Adolph Green m. Jule Styne. Introduced by Judy Holliday in the musical Bells Are Ringing.
 "The Portuguese Washerwomen" (Original title "Las Lavanderas De Portugal") m. André Popp & Roger Lucchesi
 "Whatever Will Be, Will Be (Que Sera, Sera)" w.m. Jay Livingston & Ray Evans
 "The Rain in Spain" w. Alan Jay Lerner m. Frederick Loewe. Introduced by Julie Andrews, Rex Harrison and Robert Coote in the musical My Fair Lady.
 "Rockin' The Anvil" m. John Serry Sr. arranged for accordion quartet
 "Rock With The Caveman", Steele, Pratt, Lionel Bart, Frank Chacksfield
 "Roll Over Beethoven" w.m. Chuck Berry
 "A Rose and a Baby Ruth" w.m. John D. Loudermilk
 "Round and Round" w.m. Lou Stallman & Joe Shapiro
 "St. Therese Of The Roses" w.m. Remus Harris and Arthur Strauss
 "Shape of Things" w.m. Sheldon Harnick
 "Show Me" w. Alan Jay Lerner m. Frederick Loewe. Introduced by Julie Andrews in the musical My Fair Lady
 "Singing the Blues" w.m. Melvin Endsley
 "(A Little Boy Called) Smiley", Clyde Collins
 "Soft Summer Breeze" w. Judy Spencer m. Eddie Heywood
 "Somebody Up There Likes Me" w. Sammy Cahn m. Bronislau Kaper
 "Somebody Somewhere" w.m. Frank Loesser
 "Song for a Summer Night" w.m. Robert Allen
 "Standing on the Corner" w.m. Frank Loesser. Introduced by Shorty Long, Alan Gilbert, John Henson and Roy Lazarus in the musical The Most Happy Fella.
 "Sweet Heartaches" w.m. Nat Simon & Jimmy Kennedy
 "A Sweet Old Fashioned Girl" w.m. Bob Merrill
 "A Tear Fell" w.m. Eugene Randolph & Dorian Burton
 "Teen-Age Crush" w.m. Audrey Allison & Joe Allison
 "Theme from Picnic" w. Steve Allen m. George Duning
 "There's Never Been Anyone Else But You" w. Paul Francis Webster m. Dimitri Tiomkin
 "This Could Be The Start Of Something" w.m. Steve Allen
 "This Is What I Call Love" w. Matt Dubey m. Harold Karr
 "A Thousand Miles Away", J. Shephard, N. H. Miller
 "Too Close For Comfort" w. Larry Holofcener & George David Weiss m. Jerry Bock
 "Too Much" w.m. Lee Rosenberg & Bernard Weinman
 "A Town Like Alice" w.m. Letty Katts
 "Transfusion" w.m. Jimmy Drake
 "True Love" w.m. Cole Porter. Introduced by Bing Crosby and Grace Kelly in the film High Society.
 "Two Different Worlds" w. Sid Wayne m. Al Frisch
 "Walk Hand In Hand" w.m. Johnny Cowell
 "Warm All Over" w.m. Frank Loesser
 "The Wayward Wind" w.m. Stanley Lebowsky & Herb Newman
 "When Sunny Gets Blue" w. Jack Segal m. Marvin Fisher
 "Who Needs You" w. Al Stillman m. Robert Allen
 "Who Wants To Be A Millionaire?" w.m. Cole Porter. Introduced by Celeste Holm and Frank Sinatra in the film High Society.
 "With a Little Bit of Luck" w. Alan Jay Lerner m. Frederick Loewe. Introduced by Stanley Holloway in the musical My Fair Lady.
 "Without You" w. Alan Jay Lerner m. Frederick Loewe. Introduced by Julie Andrews in the musical My Fair Lady.
 "Wouldn't It Be Loverly" w. Alan Jay Lerner m. Frederick Loewe. Introduced by Julie Andrews in the musical My Fair Lady. Performed in the 1964 film by Marni Nixon dubbing for Audrey Hepburn.
 "Wringle, Wrangle" w.m. Stan Jones. Introduced by Fess Parker in the film Westward Ho, the Wagons!
 "Written on the Wind" w.m. Sammy Cahn & Victor Young
 "Ying Tong Song" w.m. Spike Milligan
 "Young Love" w.m. Carole Joyner & Ric Cartey

Classical music

Premieres

Compositions
Hans Erich Apostel –
String Quartet No. 2
Variationen über drei Volkslieder, for orchestra
Malcolm Arnold –
Concerto No. 2 for Horn and String Orchestra, Op. 58
A Grand Grand Overture, Op. 57, for organ, three vacuum cleaners, electric floor polisher in E-flat, four rifles, and orchestra
Song of Praise, Op. 55 (text: J. Clare), for unison voices and piano
Trio for Violin, Cello, and Piano, Op. 54
Milton Babbitt – Semi-Simple Variations for piano
Jan Bach – String Trio
Samuel Barber – Summer Music for wind quintet
William Bergsma –
The Fortunate Islands, for string orchestra (revised version)
March with Trumpets, for band
Luciano Berio –
String Quartet
Variazioni "Ein Mädchen oder Weibchen", for two basset horns and strings
Arthur Bliss –
Edinburgh Overture, for orchestra
Seek the Lord (anthem), SATB choir and organ
Reginald Smith Brindle – El Polifemo de Oro
Benjamin Britten –
Antiphon, Op. 56b, for SATB choir and organ
The Prince of the Pagodas, Op. 57 (ballet in three acts)
John Cage –
27′ 10.554″ for a percussionist
Music for Piano 53–68
Music for Piano 69–84
Radio Music, for 1–8 radios
Niccolò Castiglioni – Symphony No. 1 for soprano and orchestra
Carlos Chávez – Prometheus Bound, cantata (text: Aeschylus, trans. R. Trevelyan), for alto, tenor, baritone, bass, SATB chorus and orchestra
Aaron Copland – Variations on a Shaker Melody for symphonic band (from Appalachian Spring)
Henry Cowell –
Ballad, for wind quintet
Bounce Dance, for piano
Fifteenth Anniversary, for two unspecified treble instruments
Lines from the Dead Sea Scrolls, for six-part male choir and orchestra
Septet, for five madrigal singers, clarinet, and keyboard
String Quartet No. 5
Sidney Xmas '56, for violin and piano
Sway Dance, for piano
Two-Part Invention, for soprano and alto recorders
Variations for Orchestra
Luigi Dallapiccola – Cinque canti (Greek texts, trans. Salvatore Quasimodo), for baritone and eight instruments
Mario Davidovsky –
Three Pieces for Woodwind Quartet
Noneti for Nine Instruments
Peter Maxwell Davies – Sonata for Clarinet and Piano
Henri Dutilleux – Serenade for La couronne de Marguerite Long
Herbert Eimert – Fünf Stücke, electronic music
Hanns Eisler –
Horatios Monolog (text: William Shakespeare), for voice and piano
Legende von der Entstehung des Buches Taote King (text: Bertolt Brecht), for voice and piano
Vier Szenen auf dem Lande (text: E. Strittmatter), children's or female voices and small orchestra
Von Wolkenstreifen leicht befangen (text: Johann Wolfgang von Goethe), for voice and piano
Zu Brechts Tod "Die Wälder atmen noch", for voice and four horns
Morton Feldman –
Piano Piece A
Piano Piece B
Pieces (2), for flute, alto flute, horn, trumpet, violin, and cello
Pieces (3), for string quartet
Kenneth Gaburo –
"Ad te domine", for SATB choir
"Ave Maria", for SATB choir
Elegy for a Small Orchestra
"Laetentur caeli", for SATB choir
String Quartet
"Terra tremuit", for SATB choir
Blas Galindo – Sinfonia breve, for string orchestra
Roberto Gerhard –
Lamparilla Overture for orchestra
Sonata for Cello and Piano
Songs (7), for soprano or tenor and guitar
Cecil Armstrong Gibbs – Threnody
Alberto Ginastera – Suite de danzas criollas, for piano (revised version)
Henryk Górecki –
Three Songs, Op. 3 (song cycle, text: Juliusz Słowacki, Julian Tuwim)
Variations, Op. 4
Quartettino, Op. 5
Piano Sonata No. 1, Op. 6
Songs of Joy and Rhythm, Op. 7
Sonatina in One Movement, Op. 8
Lullaby, Op. 9
From the Bird's Nest, Op. 9a (cycle of miniatures)
Camargo Guarnieri –
Chôro, for clarinet and orchestra
Chôro, for piano and orchestra
Sonata No. 4 for violin and piano
Sonata No. 5 for violin and piano
Carlos Guastavino –
La primera pregunta (El adolescente muerto), for voice and piano (text: N. Cortese)
Ombú, for voice and piano (text: N. Mileo, revised in 1989)
Mi canto, for voice and piano (text:Mileo),
Ernesto Halffter – Fantasía galaica (ballet)
Iain Hamilton – The Bermudas, Op. 33 (text: Hamilton, Jourdain, A. Marvell), for baritone, chorus, and orchestra
Karl Amadeus Hartmann – Symphony No. 1 Versuch eines Requiems
Robert Helps – Études (3), for piano
Hans Werner Henze –
Concerto per il Marigny, for piano, clarinet, bass clarinet, horn, trumpet, trombone, viola, and cello
Fünf neapolitanische Lieder (texts: anon. 17th-century), for baritone and chamber orchestra
Maratona (dance drama in one act), also a suite for two jazz bands and orchestra
Sinfonische Etüden, for orchestra
Alfred Hill –
Symphony No. 6 "Gaelic"
Symphony No. 7, in E minor
Paul Hindemith –
"Othmar Sch Sch Sch Schoeck", canon for four voices
"40, 40, 40, 40, es lebe hoch das Konzerthausleben", canon for three voices
Alan Hovhaness –
God Who Is in the Fire, Op. 146, for tenor solo, men's choir, and percussion (revised in 1965)
Greek Folk Dances (7), Op. 150, for harmonica and piano
Hercules, Op. 56, no. 4, for soprano and violin
Nocturne, Op. 20, no. 2, for flute and harp
Piano Sonata, Op. 145
Symphony No. 3, Op. 148
Andrew Imbrie –
Introit, Gradual and Alleluia for All Saints' Day, chorus and organ
Little Concerto, for piano four-hands and orchestra
Gordon Jacob –
Concerto No. 2 for Oboe and Orchestra
Sextet for Piano and Wind Quintet
Trio for Violin, Cello, and Piano
Variations on "Annie Laurie", for two piccolos, two contrabass clarinets, heckelphone, two contrabassoons, serpent, contrabass serpent, subcontrabass tuba, harmonium, and hurdy-gurdy
Dmitri Kabalevsky –
Romeo and Juliet, suite from the incidental music, Op. 56
Symphony No. 4, Op. 54
Wojciech Kilar –
Beskidy Suite for tenor, mixed choir and small orchestra
Ode Béla Bartók in memoriam, for violin, brass, and percussion
Symphony No. 2 Sinfonia concertante for piano and symphony orchestra
Gottfried Michael Koenig – Klangfiguren II, electronic music
Ernst Krenek –
Guten Morgen, Amerika, Op. 159, for chorus (text: Carl Sandburg)
Spiritus Intelligentiae, Sanctus, Whitsun oratorio for soprano and tenor with electronic music
Lars-Erik Larsson – Concertino for Violin
Bruno Maderna – Notturno, electronic music
Gian-Francesco Malipiero – Dialoghi VII for two pianos and orchestra
Frank Martin –
Études, for string orchestra
Ouverture en hommage à Mozart, for orchestra
Bohuslav Martinů –
Impromptu for Two Pianos
Legenda z dýmu bramborové [Legend of the Smoke from Potato Tops] (text: Bureš), solo voices, chorus, flute, clarinet, horn, accordion, and piano
Piano Concerto no. 4, Incantation
Sonatina for Clarinet and Piano
Sonatina for Trumpet and Piano
Yoritsune Matsudaira – Figure sonores for orchestra
Toshiro Mayuzumi and Makoto Moroi – Seven Variations, electronic music
Peter Mennin –
Concerto for Cello and Orchestra
Sonata Concertante for Violin and Piano
Gian Carlo Menotti – The Unicorn, the Gorgon, and the Manticore, or The Three Sundays of a Poet (madrigal ballet/fable)
Olivier Messiaen – Oiseaux exotiques, for piano, eleven winds, and seven percussionists
Robert Moevs – The Past Revisited, three pieces for unaccompanied violin
Frederic Mompou and Xavier Montsalvatge – Perimplinada (ballet, after Federico García Lorca),
Bo Nilsson – Zwei Stücke, for flute, bass clarinet, piano, and percussion
Luigi Nono – Il canto sospeso (text: letters of Resistance fighters), for soprano, contralto, tenor, chorus, and orchestra
Harry Partch – The Bewitched (dance satire in one act), soprano, chorus, dancers, large instrumental ensemble
Juan Carlos Paz – Música para fagot, cuerdas y batería
Vincent Persichetti
Little Recorder Book, Op. 70, 1956
Serenade no. 9, Op. 71, for two recorders
Symphony No. 6, Op. 69, for Band
Allan Pettersson – Concerto No. 2 for Strings
Daniel Pinkham –
Concerto for Violin and Orchestra
Wedding Cantata, for optional solo voices, chorus, and instrumental ensemble
Walter Piston –
Quintet for Winds
 Serenata for Orchestra
Quincy Porter –
Nocturne, for piano
Songs (2), (text: A. Porter)
Francis Poulenc – Dernier poème
Franz Reizenstein –
Concerto populare
Fantasia concertante, op.33, for violin and piano
George Rochberg –
Dialogues, for clarinet and piano
Sonata-Fantasia, for piano
Ned Rorem – Symphony No. 2
Miklós Rózsa – Concerto for Violin
Edmund Rubbra –
Piano Concerto in G, Op. 85
Improvisation for Violin and Orchestra, Op. 89
Giacinto Scelsi – Quattro Pezzi Su Una Nota Sola, for chamber orchestra of twenty-six musicians
R. Murray Schafer – Minnelieder (Minnesinger texts), for mezzo-soprano and wind quintet
Hermann Schroeder – Concerto No. 1 for Violin and Orchestra
William Schuman –
Chester Overture, for concert band
The Lord Has a Child, for SATB choir, or female choir, or solo voice, with piano (text: Langston Hughes)
New England Triptych, for orchestra
Rounds on Famous Words (4), for SATB choir (a fifth round was added in 1969)
John Serry Sr.  – Garden In Monaco – for accordion quartet
Roger Sessions – Piano Concerto
Dmitri Shostakovich –
Ispanskiye pesni [Spanish Songs], op. 100 (texts: anon., translated by Bolotin, Sikorskaya), mezzo-soprano and piano
String Quartet No. 6 in G major Op. 101
Kaikhosru Shapurji Sorabji –
Passeggiata veneziana sopra la Barcarola di Offenbach, for piano
Rosario d'arabeschi, for piano
Karlheinz Stockhausen –
Gesang der Jünglinge, electronic and concrete music
Klavierstück XI
Zeitmaße, for five woodwinds
Igor Stravinsky – Choral-Variationen über das Weihnachtslied "Vom Himmel hoch da komm' ich her", arr. from Johann Sebastian Bach, for chorus and orchestra
Sándor Szokolay – Violin Concerto, Op. 13
Virgil Thomson – Homage to Marya Freund and to the Harp, musical portrait for piano
Michael Tippett –
Bonny at Morn (arr. of Northumbrian folksong), unison choir and three recorders
Songs from the British Isles (4), SATB choir
Vladimir Ussachevsky – Piece for tape recorder
Ralph Vaughan Williams –
A Choral Flourish (text from the Psalms), for SATB choir, two trumpets, and organ
God Bless the Master of This House, for SATB choir
Preludes on Welsh Folksongs (2), for organ
Symphony No. 8
A Vision of Aeroplanes (text: N. Ezekiel), motet for SATB choir and organ
Heitor Villa-Lobos – Emperor Jones (ballet, after Eugene O'Neill),
William Walton – Cello Concerto
Mieczysław Weinberg – Piano Sonata No. 5 in A minor, Op. 58
Egon Wellesz –
Suite for solo clarinet, Op. 74
Suite for solo oboe, Op. 76
Symphony No. 5, Op. 75
Charles Wuorinen – Music for Orchestra
Iannis Xenakis – Pithoprakta, for orchestra

Opera
Malcolm Arnold – The Open Window, Op. 56 (opera in one act, libretto by S. Gilliat, after Saki), premiered on December 14, 1956, on BBC TV
Leonard Bernstein – Candide (comic operetta in two acts, libretto by Lillian Hellman, R. Wilbur, J. La Touche, D. Parker, and Bernstein, after Voltaire)
William Bergsma – The Wife of Martin Guerre (opera in three acts, libretto by J. Lewis)
Wolfgang Fortner – Bluthochzeit (opera in two acts, after Federico García Lorca)
Arnold Franchetti – The Game of Cards (opera in one act, libretto by the composer)
Kenneth Gaburo – Blur (opera in one act, libretto by the composer)
Hans Werner Henze – König Hirsch (opera in three acts, libretto by H. von Cramer, after Carlo Gozzi)
Ben Johnston – Gertrude, or Would She Be Pleased to Receive It? (chamber opera in two acts, libretto by W. Leach)
Leonard Kastle – The Swing (thirteen-minute television opera, broadcast at noon on Sunday, June 10, 1956, on NBC television)
Frank Martin – Der Sturm (opera in three acts, libretto after William Shakespeare, in a German translation by A.W. von Schlege)
Douglas Moore – The Ballad of Baby Doe
Gino Negri – Vieni qui, Carla (opera in one act, after Alberto Moravia's Gli indifferenti)
Elie Siegmeister – Miranda and the Dark Young Man (opera in one act, libretto by Edward Eager)
Robert Ward – He Who Gets Slapped (libretto by Bernard Stambler), staged under the title Pantaloon

Jazz

Musical theatre
 At the Drop of a Hat, London revue Starring Michael Flanders and Donald Swann, opened at the London fringe venue New Lindsey Theatre on December 31 and transferred to the Fortune Theatre, West End, on January 24, 1957, for a total run of 808 performances
 Bells Are Ringing, Broadway production opened at the Shubert Theatre on November 29 and ran for 924 performances
 Candide (Leonard Bernstein) – Broadway production opened at the Martin Beck Theatre on December 1 and ran for 73 performances
 Fanny, London production opened at the Drury Lane Theatre on November 15 and ran for 347 performances
 Grab Me a Gondola London production opened at the Lyric Theatre, Hammersmith on November 27 and ran for 673 performances
Happy Hunting Broadway production opened at the Majestic Theatre on December 6 and ran for 412 performances
 Irma La Douce, Paris production opened at the Théâtre Gramont on November 12
 Li'l Abner (Gene de Paul and Johnny Mercer) – Broadway production opened at the St. James Theatre on November 15 and ran for 693 performances
 The Most Happy Fella, Broadway production opened at the Imperial Theatre on May 3 and ran for 676 performances
 Mr. Wonderful, Broadway production opened at the Broadway Theatre on March 22 and ran for 383 performances
 My Fair Lady (Alan Jay Lerner and Frederick Loewe) – Broadway production opened at the Mark Hellinger Theatre on March 15 and ran for 2717 performances
 Plain and Fancy, London production opened at the Drury Lane Theatre on January 25 and ran for 217 performances

Musical films
 Anything Goes starring Bing Crosby and Donald O'Connor
 Carousel starring Gordon MacRae and Shirley Jones
 The Court Jester starring Danny Kaye, Glynis Johns, Basil Rathbone and Angela Lansbury
 The Girl Can't Help It starring Jayne Mansfield and Tom Ewell, and featuring Julie London, Ray Anthony, Fats Domino and The Platters.
 High Society starring Bing Crosby, Grace Kelly, Frank Sinatra, Louis Armstrong and Celeste Holm
 It's a Wonderful World starring George Cole and featuring Ted Heath and Dennis Lotis
 It's Great to Be Young starring John Mills and Cecil Parker
 The King and I starring Yul Brynner and Deborah Kerr
 Pardners starring Dean Martin, Jerry Lewis and Lori Nelson
 A Touch of the Sun starring Frankie Howerd, Ruby Murray and Dennis Price
 The Vagabond King starring Kathryn Grayson

Births
January 1 –
Andy Gill, English post-punk guitarist and record producer (died 2020)
Martin Plaza, Australian singer-songwriter and guitarist
January 3 – Julie Miller, singer
January 4 –
Alex Cline, American drummer and educator
Nels Cline, American guitarist and songwriter (Wilco)
January 9 – Waltraud Meier, operatic soprano
January 10 – Shawn Colvin, American singer
January 14 – Ben Heppner, Canadian tenor
January 17 – Paul Young, English pop-rock singer and guitarist (Streetband)
January 18 –
Tom Bailey (Thompson Twins)
Christoph Prégardien, operatic tenor
January 22 – Steve Riley, American drummer
January 24 – Lounès Matoub, Algerian Berber Kabyle singer
January 25 – Andy Cox (The Beat, Fine Young Cannibals)
January 29 –
Irlene Mandrell, American actress and singer
Amii Stewart, American singer
January 30 – Henry Doktorski, accordionist
January 31 – Johnny Rotten, singer (Sex Pistols)
February 1 – Exene Cervenka, American singer-songwriter and guitarist (X, The Knitters and Auntie Christ)
February 3 – Lee Ranaldo (Sonic Youth)
February 8 – Dave Meros, American bass player (Spock's Beard)
February 13 – Peter Hook (Joy Division, New Order)
February 26 – Keisuke Kuwata, Japanese musician
March 2 – John Cowsill (The Cowsills)
March 5 – Teena Marie, singer (died 2010)
March 9 – Sergej Larin, operatic tenor (died 2008)
March 12 – Steve Harris (Iron Maiden)
March 13 – John Frandsen, Danish composer
March 16 – Vladimír Godár, composer
April 14 – Barbara Bonney, operatic and concert soprano
April 28 – Jimmy Barnes, Australian musician
May 4 – Sharon Jones, African American soul singer (died 2016)
May 7 – Steve Diggle, English punk musician (Buzzcocks and Flag of Convenience)
May 12 – Greg Phillinganes, American keyboardist
May 18 – Jim Moginie, Australian rock guitarist (Midnight Oil)
May 25 –
Sugar Minott, reggae singer
Helen Terry, pop singer and producer
May 29 – La Toya Jackson, American singer
June – Chi-chi Nwanoku, English double bass player
June 3 –
Lynne Dawson, soprano
Danny Wilde, American singer and guitarist (The Quick and The Rembrandts)
June 5 – Kenny G, saxophonist
June 23 – Randy Jackson, American bassist and producer
June 24 – Michael Coleman, American singer-songwriter and guitarist (died 2014)
June 30 – Ronald Winans, African American musician (died 2005)
July 12  – Sandi Patty, American gospel singer
July 15 –
Ian Curtis, vocalist (Joy Division) (died 1980)
Marky Ramone, American drummer and songwriter (Ramones, Richard Hell and the Voidoids, and Misfits)
Joe Satriani, famous guitar virtuoso, current guitarist for Chickenfoot
July 20 – Paul Cook (Sex Pistols)
August 1 – Steve Green, American Christian musician
August 3 – Graeme Koehne, composer and music teacher
August 8 –
Chris Foreman (Madness)
David Grant, English singer and vocal coach
August 18 –
Kelly Willard, American Christian singer
Jon "Bermuda" Schwartz, American drummer
August 26 – Sally Beamish, composer
August 27 – Glen Matlock, guitarist (Sex Pistols)
August 29 – GG Allin, American singer-songwriter (died 1993)
September 4 – Blackie Lawless, American singer-songwriter (W.A.S.P.)
September 10 – Johnnie Fingers, Irish musician (The Boomtown Rats)
September 22 – Debby Boone, singer
October 2 – Freddie Jackson, soul singer
October 16 – Marin Alsop, orchestral conductor
October 23 – Dwight Yoakam, singer-songwriter
November 4 – Igor Talkov, Russian singer/songwriter (died 1991)
November 8 –
Alan Frew, lead singer (Glass Tiger)
Steven Miller, American record producer
November 12 – Stevie Young musician (AC/DC, Starfighters)
November 17 – Philip Grange, composer
November 20 – Kool DJ Red Alert, disc jockey
November 22 – Lawrence Gowan, musician-songwriter (Styx, Rhinegold)
November 24 – Jouni Kaipainen, composer
November 25 – Kalle Randalu, Estonian pianist and educator
December 6 –
Peter Buck, American rock guitarist R.E.M.
Randy Rhoads, American heavy metal guitarist (Ozzy Osbourne band) (died 1982)
December 8 –
Warren Cuccurullo (Missing Persons, Duran Duran)
Pierre Pincemaille, French musician
December 13 – Majida El Roumi, singer
December 19
Masami Akita, Noise musician, (aka Merzbow)
William Orbit, composer
December 20 – Anita Ward, American singer
December 23 – Dave Murray (Iron Maiden)
December 28 – Nigel Kennedy, crossover violinist

Deaths
January 3 – Alexander Gretchaninov, composer, 91
January 5 – Mistinguett, entertainer, 80
January 9 – Paul de Maleingreau, organist and composer, 68
January 20 – Lucy Isabelle Marsh, soprano and early recording artist, 77
January 27 – Erich Kleiber, conductor, 65
February 2 – Charles Grapewin, vaudeville performer, 86
February 4 – Peder Gram, organist and composer, 74
February 17 – John N. Klohr, composer of band music, 86
February 18 – Gustave Charpentier, composer, 95
February 21 – Edwin Franko Goldman, band composer, 78
February 26 – Elsie Janis, singer, songwriter and actress, 66
March 5 – Erich Itor Kahn, composer, 50 (brain haemorrhage)
March 11 – Sergei Vasilenko, Russian composer, 83
March 16 – Joseph John Richards, conductor, composer and music teacher, 77
March 28 – Thomas de Hartmann, composer, 70
April 9 – Jack Little, composer, actor, singer and songwriter
April 15 – Kathleen Howard, opera singer, character actress, 71
May 20 – Harry Stewart, comedian, singer, and songwriter, 47 (car accident)
June 11 – Frankie Trumbauer, US saxophonist, bandleader and sometime singer, 55 (heart attack)
June 23 – Reinhold Glière, composer, 81
June 25 – Michio Miyagi, blind Japanese composer and inventor of musical instruments, 62 (fall from train)
June 26 (in a car accident):
Clifford Brown, jazz trumpeter, 25
Richie Powell, jazz pianist, 24
July 18 – Violet Loraine, musical theatre star, 69
August 14
May Brahe, songwriter, 71
Jaroslav Řídký, composer, 58
August 31 – Yves Nat, pianist and composer, 65
September 6 – Felix Borowski, composer and music teacher, 84
September 9 – Rupert Hughes, composer, 84
September 21 – Rigoberto López Pérez, composer and poet, 35 (shot)
September 27 – Gerald Finzi, composer, 55 ("severe brain inflammation")
October 1 – Albert Von Tilzer, songwriter, 78
October 12 – Don Lorenzo Perosi, composer, 83
October 18 – Harry Parry, jazz musician, 44
October 19 – Isham Jones, US bandleader and composer, 62
October 22 – Valda Valkyrien, ballerina, 61
October 26 – Walter Gieseking, pianist, 60
November 1 – Tommy Johnson, blues musician, 60
November 5 – Art Tatum, jazz pianist, 47 (kidney failure)
November 10 – Victor Young, violinist, conductor and composer, 56 (brain haemorrhage)
November 24 – Guido Cantelli, conductor, 36 (plane crash)
November 26 – Tommy Dorsey, bandleader, 51 (choking)
November 30
Ludvík Kuba, artist and musician, 93
Jean Schwartz, songwriter, 78
December 7 – Henry Fillmore, composer and publisher, 75

Awards

Eurovision Song Contest
Eurovision Song Contest 1956

References

 
20th century in music
Music by year